Taste is the sensation and/or perception of flavors.

Taste may also refer to:

Common uses
Taste (sociology), the sociological concept of expressing preferences deemed appropriate or inappropriate by society

Arts, entertainment, and media

Music

Groups
Taste (Irish band), an Irish rock band formed in the 1960s
Taste (Australian band), an Australian band active in the 1970s

Albums
Taste (The Telescopes album), 1989
Taste (Taste album), 1969

Songs
"Taste" (song), a 2018 single by Tyga featuring Offset
"Taste", a song by Animal Collective from their 2009 Merriweather Post Pavilion
"Taste", a song by Phish from their 1996 album Billy Breathes
"Taste", a song by Ride from their 1990 Nowhere
 "Taste", a song by Betty Who from Betty
 "Taste (Make It Shake)", a 2019 song by Aitch

Other uses in arts, entertainment, and media
"Taste" (short story), a short story by Roald Dahl
Taste (TV series), a 1994 Food Network series created by David Rosengarten
Taste (TV series), a 2005 cookery television show
Taste, a 2004 TV-movie starring Richard Ruccolo
Taste, an online magazine owned by Penguin Random House
Taste Media, a record label
Taste: My Life Through Food, a 2021 memoir by Stanley Tucci

Brands and enterprises
Taste (software), a Macintosh word processor
Taste (supermarket) a supermarket, part of the AS Watson Group, Hong Kong

See also

Degustation, the careful, appreciative tasting of various foods
Tastemaker (disambiguation)
Wine tasting
Tast (disambiguation)